is a Japanese football manager and former player who manages J1 League club Yokohama FC.

Coaching career
Yomoda was born in Chiba on March 14, 1973. He attended Juntendo University before becoming a football coach for University of Tsukuba. He was also a scout for Japan national team under Takeshi Okada tenure and he entered Consadole Sapporo (later Hokkaido Consadole Sapporo) staff when Okada joined the club as manager.

For several years, Yomoda coached the U-18 squad: after the club fired Ivica Barbarić in July 2015, he was appointed as first-squad manager. Yomoda led Consadole to J2 League champions in 2016 season and Consadole was promoted to J1 League. In 2018, Consadole signed with new manager Mihailo Petrović, so Yomoda became an assistant coach.

In 10 December 2021, Yomoda signed as manager of J2 relegated club, Yokohama FC after Tomonobu Hayakawa resign from club because worst performance his club relegation to J2.On 23 October 2022, Yomoda brought his club promotion to the J1 League after missing a season of playing because last season they were relegated to bottom position.

Managerial statistics

Honours

Manager
 Yokohama FC
 J2 League (Runner-up) : 2022

References

External links

Profile at Hokkaido Consadole Sapporo

1973 births
Living people
Juntendo University alumni
Association football people from Chiba Prefecture
Japanese footballers
Japanese football managers
J1 League managers
J2 League managers
Hokkaido Consadole Sapporo managers
Yokohama FC managers
Association footballers not categorized by position